Arundika Fernando  is a Sri Lankan politician, a member of the Parliament of Sri Lanka. He is a member of Sri Lanka Freedom Party.
Fernando was sacked from his deputy minister position in 2017 by President Sirisena. He has claimed to have served in the Sri Lankan Air Force as a pilot and later in the SriLankan Airlines. However the Sri Lankan Air Force denied that he had ever served in the SLAF in any role and the only record of his career as a pilot is a failed Flying Aptitude Test. The Airline Pilots' Guild of Sri Lanka also denied that he was ever a pilot in the SriLankan Airlines.

References

https://www.colombotelegraph.com/index.php/expose-billions-rupee-ethanol-smuggling-racket-is-a-customs-inside-operation-with-govt-politicians/

1971 births
Living people
Members of the 14th Parliament of Sri Lanka
Members of the 15th Parliament of Sri Lanka
Members of the 16th Parliament of Sri Lanka
Sri Lanka Podujana Peramuna politicians
Sri Lanka Freedom Party politicians
United People's Freedom Alliance politicians
Sinhalese politicians